Grant County is a county located in the northern part of the U.S. state of Kentucky. As of the 2020 census, the population was 24,941. Its county seat is Williamstown. The county was formed in 1820 and named for Colonel John Grant, who led a party of settlers in 1779 to establish Grant's Station, in today's Bourbon County, Kentucky. Grant County is included in the Cincinnati-Middletown, OH-KY-IN Metropolitan Statistical Area. Grant County residents voted to allow full alcohol sales in the county by a margin of 56% to 44% in a special election on December 22, 2015. In the 19th century, Grant County contained multiple saloons.

The Grant County News, established in 1906 and published in Williamstown, is preserved on microfilm by the University of Kentucky Libraries. The microfilm holdings are listed in a master negative database on the UK Libraries Preservation and Digital Programs website.

History
Grant County was established in 1820 from land taken from Pendleton County. The historic courthouse, built in 1939, replaced two earlier structures.  A new judicial center was completed in April 2010.  In 1975, many residents reported seeing a UFO at Williamstown Lake.

Geography

Adjacent counties
 Boone County  (north)
 Kenton County  (northeast)
 Pendleton County  (east)
 Harrison County  (southeast)
 Scott County  (south)
 Owen County  (west)
 Gallatin County  (northwest)

Demographics

As of the census of 2000, there were 22,384 people, 8,175 households, and 6,221 families residing in the county. The racial makeup of the county was 98.31% White, 0.25% Black or African American, 0.23% Native American, 0.29% Asian, 0.05% Pacific Islander, 0.32% from other races, and 0.54% from two or more races.  1.04% of the population were Hispanic or Latino of any race.

There were 8,175 households, out of which 39.60% had children under the age of 18 living with them, 60.10% were married couples living together, 11.10% had a female householder with no husband present, and 23.90% were non-families. 19.80% of all households were made up of individuals, and 8.20% had someone living alone who was 65 years of age or older.  The average household size was 2.72 and the average family size was 3.10.

In the county, the population was spread out, with 28.70% under the age of 18, 9.40% from 18 to 24, 31.50% from 25 to 44, 20.90% from 45 to 64, and 9.50% who were 65 years of age or older.  The median age was 33 years. For every 100 females there were 97.10 males.  For every 100 females age 18 and over, there were 94.80 males.

The median income for a household in the county was $38,438, and the median income for a family was $42,605. Males had a median income of $31,987 versus $23,669 for females. The per capita income for the county was $16,776.  About 9.00% of families and 11.10% of the population were below the poverty line, including 15.10% of those under age 18 and 13.40% of those age 65 or over.

Education

Grant County has six schools: Crittenden Mt Zion (CMZ), Dry Ridge Elementary (DRE), Sherman Elementary (SES), Mason Corinth Elementary (MCE), Grant County Middle School (GCMS), Grant County High School (GCHS) and Williamstown Independent Schools (WES)- (WMS) – (WHS).

Grant County's only library is located in Williamstown.

Politics

Infrastructure

Transportation
Public transportation is provided by Senior Services of Northern Kentucky with demand-response service.

Notable attractions
Grant County, specifically in Williamstown, is the location of the Ark Encounter, operated by the Christian apologetics organization Answers in Genesis and opened in 2016.

Communities
 Corinth
 Crittenden
 Dry Ridge
 Jonesville
 Williamstown (county seat)

See also

 National Register of Historic Places listings in Grant County, Kentucky

References

External links
 Historical Texts and Images of Grant County

 
Kentucky counties
1820 establishments in Kentucky
Populated places established in 1820